David Scott is the leader of the Scottish pop group Pearlfishers.

Scott has been the main songwriter, producer and vocalist of Pearlfishers since their inception. Scott is also a member of BMX Bandits. He has produced recordings and played with a wide range of artists including Amy Allison, Alex Chilton, Yeon Gene Wang, Ricky Ross, Maher Shalal Hash Baz and Bill Wells.

Scott also works as a broadcaster on BBC Radio fronting music documentaries and also has contributed music to many theatre productions in Scotland and co-organised all star tribute shows to Brian Wilson, Ennio Morricone and Serge Gainsbourg. David is a Senior Lecturer in the School of Creative and Cultural Industries at the University of the West of Scotland and is the Programme Leader for their MA in Songwriting and Performance.

References

Living people
Scottish pop musicians
Year of birth missing (living people)
Academics of the University of the West of Scotland